Bradyrrhoa is a genus of snout moths. It was described by Philipp Christoph Zeller in 1848.

Species
 Bradyrrhoa adrianae Asselbergs, 2002
 Bradyrrhoa cantenerella (Duponchel, 1837)
 Bradyrrhoa confiniella Zeller, 1848
 Bradyrrhoa divaricella Ragonot, 1887
 Bradyrrhoa gilveolella (Treitschke, 1833)
 Bradyrrhoa luteola (La Harpe, 1860)
 Bradyrrhoa marianella Ragonot, 1887
 Bradyrrhoa trapezella (Duponchel, 1836)

References

Phycitini
Pyralidae genera